Dichomeris aomoriensis is a moth of the family Gelechiidae. It was described by Kyu-Tek Park and Ronald W. Hodges in 1995. It is known from Japan (Honshu) and south-eastern Siberia.

The length of the forewings is 10.5–11 mm. The forewings are brownish grey, with a small discal stigma near the middle and a short black streak near the discal spot at the fold. There are eight to nine spots along the margin. The hindwings are orange grey.

References

aomoriensis
Moths described in 1995